State Highway 37 (SH 37) is a State Highway in Kerala, India that starts in Adoor and ends in Sasthamkotta. The highway is 18.2 km long.

Almost the entire length of this route is notified as National Highway 183 A.

The Route Map 
Adoor - Thuvayoor - Bharanikavu junction - Sasthamkotta junction

See also 
Roads in Kerala
List of State Highways in Kerala

References 

State Highways in Kerala
Roads in Kollam district
Roads in Pathanamthitta district